The Barth Classic was a golf tournament on the LPGA Tour from 1974 to 1980. It was played at the Plymouth Country Club in Plymouth, Indiana.

Winners
Hoosier LPGA Classic
1974 JoAnne Carner

Hoosier Classic
1975 Betsy Cullen
1976 JoAnne Carner (2)
1977 Debbie Austin
1978 Pat Bradley

Barth Classic
1979 Sally Little
1980 Sandra Spuzich

References

Former LPGA Tour events
Golf in Indiana
Recurring sporting events established in 1974
Recurring sporting events disestablished in 1980
1974 establishments in Indiana
1980 disestablishments in Indiana
History of women in Indiana